Lincoln Rhyme: Hunt for the Bone Collector is an American crime drama television series that premiered on NBC as part of the  2019–20 television season, on January 10, 2020 and ran until March 13, 2020. The series is based on the 1997 novel The Bone Collector by Jeffery Deaver. While popular as a mid-season replacement show, NBC made the decision in June 2020 to cancel after one season.

Synopsis
The series follows NYPD officer Amelia Sachs, who partners up with disabled forensic expert Lincoln Rhyme and his team to solve cases in pursuit of the legendary serial killer, the Bone Collector.

Cast

Main
 Russell Hornsby as Lincoln Rhyme, a brilliant but hardheaded forensic criminologist who suffers near-fatal injuries while on the job, leaving him a tetraplegic. He nevertheless continues his work remotely, working with others to solve cases.
 Arielle Kebbel as Amelia Sachs, an intuitive rookie NYPD officer who becomes Lincoln's most trusted ally in the hunt for the Bone Collector.
 Roslyn Ruff as Claire, Lincoln's caregiver and assistant
 Ramses Jimenez as Eric Castillo, an NYPD detective and Sellitto's new partner
 Brooke Lyons as Kate, a forensic scientist who worked with Lincoln during his time on the force
 Tate Ellington as Felix, a computer expert working with the team who is quick to speak his mind
 Courtney Grosbeck as Rachel Sachs, Amelia's teenage sister
 Brían F. O'Byrne as Peter Taylor / the Bone Collector, a serial killer Lincoln has chased for his entire career who reemerges to complete what he considers unfinished business between the two.
 Michael Imperioli as Rick Sellitto, a veteran NYPD detective and Lincoln's former partner

Recurring

 Claire Coffee as Danielle, the wife of the Bone Collector
 Tawny Cypress as Naia, Lincoln's ex-fiancée
 Jaidon Walls as Camden, Lincoln's son

Guest
 Rosa Evangelina Arrendondo as Chief Olsen, the chief of police

 Tracie Thoms as Agent Cutter, an FBI Agent who was Lincoln's former supervisor in the NYPD

Episodes

Production

Development
On January 17, 2019, it was announced that NBC had given the production a pilot order under the name Lincoln based on The Bone Collector novel. The pilot was written by VJ Boyd and Mark Bianculli who executive produces along with Avi Nir, Alon Shtruzman, Peter Traugott and Rachel Kaplan. Production companies involved with the pilot include Sony Pictures Television and Universal Television. On February 21, 2019, it was announced that Seth Gordon would direct the pilot.

On May 11, 2019, it was announced that the production had been given a series order. A few days later, it was announced that the series would premiere as a mid-season replacement in the mid-season of 2020. On November 8, 2019, NBC changed the title from Lincoln to Lincoln Rhyme: Hunt for the Bone Collector The series premiered on January 10, 2020. On June 10, 2020, NBC canceled the series after one season.

Casting
In March 2019, it was announced that Russell Hornsby, Michael Imperioli, Arielle Kebbel, Courtney Grosbeck, Ramses Jimenez, Brooke Lyons, Roslyn Ruff and Tate Ellington had joined the cast for their pilot lead roles.

Reception

Critical response
On Rotten Tomatoes, the series holds an approval rating of 36% with an average rating of 5/10, based on 11 reviews. On Metacritic, it has a weighted average score of 44 out of 100, based on 4 critics, indicating "mixed or average reviews".

Ratings

References

External links
 
 

2020 American television series debuts
2020 American television series endings
2020s American crime drama television series
American thriller television series
English-language television shows
Fictional portrayals of the New York City Police Department
Forensic science in popular culture
NBC original programming
Television shows based on American novels
Television series by Sony Pictures Television
Television series by Universal Television
Television shows set in New York City
Television shows filmed in New Jersey